Ramón Iriarte (born 12 January 1948) is a Venezuelan footballer. He played in six matches for the Venezuela national football team from 1969 to 1975. He was also part of Venezuela's squad for the 1975 Copa América tournament.

References

1948 births
Living people
Venezuelan footballers
Venezuela international footballers
Place of birth missing (living people)
Association football forwards
Deportivo Italia players